Simplischnochiton is a genus of polyplacophoran molluscs.

References 

Prehistoric chiton genera